Dyadobacter jejuensis  is a bacterium from the genus of Dyadobacter which has been isolated from seawater from the Jeju Island from Korea.

References

External links
Type strain of Dyadobacter jejuensis at BacDive -  the Bacterial Diversity Metadatabase	

Cytophagia
Bacteria described in 2013